James Leslie Darcy (28 October 189524 May 1917) was an Australian boxer. He was a middleweight, but held the Australian Heavyweight Championship title at the same time.

Les Darcy was the 2003 Inductee for the Australian National Boxing Hall of Fame Old Timers category and was the first to be elevated to Legend status in 2009.

History

Les Darcy was born near Maitland, New South Wales. He started boxing as an amateur at age fifteen and quickly turned professional. He won his first sixteen fights before challenging the veteran Bob Whitelaw for the Australian welterweight title. Darcy lost the twenty-round decision but, in a rematch, knocked Whitelaw out in five rounds.

Darcy graduated from regional bouts to fighting in Sydney Stadium, in Rushcutters Bay, and promoters began to import talent to challenge him. He lost his first two fights in Sydney, one by decision and one by foul, to America's Fritz Holland. The next year Darcy faced another American, Jeff Smith, in what was considered a contest for the Australian world middleweight title. When Darcy complained of a low blow at the end of the fifth round, the referee believed that Darcy did not want to continue and awarded the decision to Smith. In a rematch, Darcy was awarded the victory when Smith punched him in the groin.

As Australian world middleweight champ, Darcy defeated such top-flight visiting Americans as Eddie McGoorty, Billy Murray, Jimmy Clabby, George Chip, George "KO" Brown, and Buck Crouse, as well as knocking out Smith and Holland in rematches. Darcy's opponents are said to have admired his courage, stamina, and punching power. In 1916, Darcy knocked Harold Hardwick out to capture the Australian heavyweight title.

Darcy became embroiled in the politics of conscription during World War I, and left Australia for the United States to avoid the aggravation. He died on 24 May 1917 from septicaemia and medical complications, which was speculated to be from dental work he received to replace teeth that had been knocked out during a bout.

After his death, Darcy's embalmed body was returned to Australia, where an estimated half-million people paid their respects. His brother Frank, also a boxer who showed many of the attributes of his brother, including pluck, died on 9 May 1919 from influenza, and was buried in the Catholic Cemetery, East Maitland.

Legacy
Darcy was inducted into the International Boxing Hall of Fame in 1993, the World Boxing Hall of Fame in October 1998, and the Australian National Boxing Hall of Fame in 2003.

In 2001, Raffaele Marcellino's opera The Flight of Les Darcy, with libretto by Robert Jarman, premiered at the "10 Days on the Island" festival in Hobart. The character of Darcy has no singing role but is portrayed by a dancer, and draws on the story that he played the violin to prepare himself for fights.

Professional boxing record

|-
| style="text-align:center;" colspan="8"|52 Wins (32 knockouts, 19 decisions, 1 disqualification), 4 Losses, 0 Draws
|-
|align=center style="border-style: none none solid solid; background: #e3e3e3"|Res.
|align=center style="border-style: none none solid solid; background: #e3e3e3"|Record
|align=center style="border-style: none none solid solid; background: #e3e3e3"|Opponent
|align=center style="border-style: none none solid solid; background: #e3e3e3"|Type
|align=center style="border-style: none none solid solid; background: #e3e3e3"|Rd.
|align=center style="border-style: none none solid solid; background: #e3e3e3"|Date
|align=center style="border-style: none none solid solid; background: #e3e3e3"|Location
|align=center style="border-style: none none solid solid; background: #e3e3e3"|Notes
|-align=center
|Win
|52–4
|align=left| George Chip
|
|
|
|align=left|
|align=left|
|-align=center 
|Win
|50–4
|align=left| Dave Smith
|
|
|
|align=left|
|align=left|
|-align=center 
|Win
|49–4
|align=left| Dave Smith
|
|
|
|align=left|
|align=left|
|-align=center 
|Win
|48–4
|align=left| Buck Crouse
|
|
| 
|align=left|
|align=left|
|-align=center
|Win
|47–4
|align=left| Alex Costica
|
|
|
|align=left|
|align=left|
|-align=center
|Win
|46–4
|align=left| George "K.O." Brown
|
|
|
|align=left|
|align=left|
|-align=center
|Win
|45–4
|align=left| Les O'Donnell
|
|
|
|align=left|
|align=left|
|-align=center
|Win
|44–4
|align=left| Harold Hardwick
|
|
|
|align=left|
|align=left|
|-align=center
|Win
|43–4
|align=left| George "K.O." Brown
|
|
|
|align=left|
|align=left|
|-align=center
|Win
|42–4
|align=left| Eddie McGoorty
|
|
|
|align=left|
|align=left|
|-align=center
|Win
|41–4
|align=left| Billy Murray
|
|
|
|align=left|
|align=left|
|-align=center
|Win
|40–4
|align=left| Jimmy Clabby
|
|
|
|align=left|
|align=left|
|-align=center
|Win
|39–4
|align=left| Fred Dyer
|
|
|
|align=left|
|align=left|
|-align=center
|Win
|38–4
|align=left| Billy Murray
|
|
|
|align=left|
|align=left|
|-align=center
|Win
|37–4
|align=left| Eddie McGoorty
|
|
|
|align=left|
|align=left|
|-align=center
|Win
|36–4
|align=left| Mick King
|
|
|
|align=left|
|align=left|
|-align=center
|Win
|35–4
|align=left| Jeff Smith
|
|
|
|align=left|
|align=left|
|-align=center
|Win
|34–4
|align=left| Fritz Holland
|
|
|
|align=left|
|align=left|
|-align=center
|Win
|33–4
|align=left| Henri Demlen
|
|
|
|align=left|
|align=left|
|-align=center
|Win
|32–4
|align=left| Fritz Holland
|
|
|
|align=left|
|align=left|
|-align=center
|Win
|31–4
|align=left| Frank Loughrey
|
|
|
|align=left|
|align=left|
|-align=center
|Loss
|30–4
|align=left| Jeff Smith
|
|
|
|align=left|
|align=left|
|-align=center
|Win
|30–3
|align=left| Fred Dyer
|
|
|
|align=left|
|align=left|
|-align=center
|Win
|29–3
|align=left| Gus Christie
|
|
|
|align=left|
|align=left|
|-align=center
|Win
|28–3
|align=left| Victor "K.O." Marchand
|
|
|
|align=left|
|align=left|
|-align=center
|Loss
|27–3
|align=left| Fritz Holland
|
|
|
|align=left|
|align=left|
|-align=center
|Loss
|27–2
|align=left| Fritz Holland
|
|
|
|align=left|
|align=left|
|-align=center
|Win
|27–1
|align=left| Billy McNabb
|
|
|
|align=left|
|align=left|
|-align=center
|Win
|26–1
|align=left| Bob Whitelaw
|
|
|
|align=left|
|align=left|
|-align=center
|Win
|25–1
|align=left| Young Hanley
|
|
|
|align=left|
|align=left|
|-align=center
|Win
|24–1
|align=left| Jack Clarke
|
|
|
|align=left|
|align=left|
|-align=center
|Loss
|23–1
|align=left| Bob Whitelaw
|
|
|
|align=left|
|align=left|
|-align=center
|Win
|23–0
|align=left| Billy McNabb
|
|
|
|align=left|
|align=left|
|-align=center
|Win
|22–0
|align=left| Joe Shakespeare
|
|
|
|align=left|
|align=left|
|-align=center
|Win
|21–0
|align=left| Reg Regio Delaney
|
|
|
|align=left|
|align=left|
|-align=center
|Win
|20–0
|align=left| Billy Hannan
|
|
|
|align=left|
|align=left|
|-align=center
|Win
|19–0
|align=left| Jim Burns
|
|
|
|align=left|
|align=left|
|-align=center
|Win
|18–0
|align=left| Dave Depena
|
|
|
|align=left|
|align=left|
|-align=center
|Win
|17–0
|align=left| Peter Barnes
|
|
|
|align=left|
|align=left|
|-align=center
|Win
|16–0
|align=left| Peter Devon
|
|
|
|align=left|
|align=left|
|-align=center
|Win
|15–0
|align=left| Harry Richards
|
|
|
|align=left|
|align=left|
|-align=center
|Win
|14–0
|align=left| Jim Burns
|
|
|
|align=left|
|align=left|
|-align=center
|Win
|13–0
|align=left| Tom Page
|
|
|
|align=left|
|align=left|
|-align=center
|Win
|12–0
|align=left| Harry Emery
|
|
|
|align=left|
|align=left|
|align=left|
|-align=center
|Win
|11–0
|align=left| Tom Rhymer
|
|
|
|align=left|
|align=left| 
|align=left|
|-align=center
|Win
|10–0
|align=left| Roger Fairbairn
|
|
|
|align=left|
|align=left|
|align=left|
|-align=center
|Win
|9–0
|align=left| Harry Ford
|
|
|
|align=left|
|align=left|
|-align=center
|Win
|8–0
|align=left| Peter Cook
|
|
|
|align=left|
|align=left|
|-align=center
|Win
|7–0
|align=left| Harry Emery
|
|
|
|align=left|
|align=left|
|-align=center
|Win
|6–0
|align=left| Les Althorne
|
|
|
|align=left|
|align=left|
|-align=center
|Win
|5–0
|align=left| Sam Norman
|
|
|
|align=left|
|align=left|
|-align=center
|Win
|4–0
|align=left| Sid Pascoe
|
|
|
|align=left|
|align=left|
|-align=center
|Win
|3–0
|align=left| Tom Donohue
|
|
|
|align=left|
|align=left|
|-align=center
|Win
|2–0
|align=left| Young Texas
|
|
| 
|align=left|
|align=left|
|-align=center
|Win
|1–0
|align=left| George 'Governor' Balser
|
|
|
|align=left|
|align=left|

References

Other resources

 
 Maitland Tourism (2008). Les Darcy: The Legend: 1895–1917. [Brochure]. Maitland, New South Wales: Maitland Tourism & Maitland City Council.

Reference sources
Pictures held and digitised as part of the Arnold Thomas boxing collection by the National Library of Australia  
 James Lesley Darcy
 James Lesley Darcy
 Les Darcy giving demonstration of punches with his tutor Dave Smith

Further reading

External links
 ADB biography
 Les Darcy at the National Museum of Australia

|-

Died

|-

1895 births
1917 deaths
Australian folklore
Australian male boxers
Australian people of Irish descent
Australian Roman Catholics
Deaths from sepsis
Heavyweight boxers
Middleweight boxers
People from Maitland, New South Wales
Sport Australia Hall of Fame inductees
Sportsmen from New South Wales